is a Japanese badminton player.

Achievements

Asian Junior Championships 
Boys' singles

BWF World Tour 
The BWF World Tour, announced on 19 March 2017 and implemented in 2018, is a series of elite badminton tournaments, sanctioned by Badminton World Federation (BWF). The BWF World Tour are divided into six levels, namely World Tour Finals, Super 1000, Super 750, Super 500, Super 300 (part of the HSBC World Tour), and the BWF Tour Super 100.

Men's singles

BWF Grand Prix 
The BWF Grand Prix has two levels: Grand Prix and Grand Prix Gold. It is a series of badminton tournaments, sanctioned by Badminton World Federation (BWF) since 2007.

Men's singles

  BWF Grand Prix Gold tournament
  BWF Grand Prix tournament

BWF International Challenge/Series 
Men's singles

  BWF International Challenge tournament
  BWF International Series tournament

References

External links 
 

1989 births
Living people
Sportspeople from Saga Prefecture
Japanese male badminton players
Badminton players at the 2018 Asian Games
Asian Games bronze medalists for Japan
Asian Games medalists in badminton
Medalists at the 2018 Asian Games
21st-century Japanese people